Forrest Leroy "Hick" Cady (January 26, 1886 – March 3, 1946) was a backup catcher in Major League Baseball who played for the Boston Red Sox (1912–17) and Philadelphia Phillies (1919). Cady batted and threw right-handed. He was born in Bishop Hill, Illinois.

In a seven-season career, Cady was a .240 hitter with one home run and 74 RBI in 355 games played.

Cady managed in the minors in 1922 and 1924.

Cady died in a hotel fire in Cedar Rapids, Iowa, at the age of 60.

References

External links

 Baseball Almanac
 

1886 births
1946 deaths
People from Bishop Hill, Illinois
Boston Red Sox players
Philadelphia Phillies players
Major League Baseball catchers
Baseball players from Illinois
Accidental deaths in Iowa
Deaths from fire in the United States
Minor league baseball managers
Kewanee Boilermakers players
Ottumwa Packers players
Evansville River Rats players
Newark Indians players
Sacramento Senators players
Vernon Tigers players
Augusta Tygers players
Danville Veterans players
Columbus Senators players